Lambros Vasilopoulos (born 25 March 1972) is a Greek cyclist. He competed at the 1996 Summer Olympics, the 2000 Summer Olympics and the 2004 Summer Olympics.

References

External links
 

1972 births
Living people
Greek male cyclists
Olympic cyclists of Greece
Cyclists at the 1996 Summer Olympics
Cyclists at the 2000 Summer Olympics
Cyclists at the 2004 Summer Olympics
Sportspeople from Patras
21st-century Greek people